Patrick Howdle (born 24 April 1963) is a British biathlete. He competed in the relay event at the 1984 Winter Olympics.

References

1963 births
Living people
British male biathletes
Olympic biathletes of Great Britain
Biathletes at the 1984 Winter Olympics
People from Driffield